Cochliopina is a genus of very small freshwater snails that have an operculum, aquatic gastropod mollusks in the family Hydrobiidae, the mud snails.

Species
Species within the genus Cochliopina include::
Cochliopina compacta Pilsbry, 1910
Cochliopina milleri Taylor, 1966 Miller's snail

References

 
Hydrobiidae
Taxonomy articles created by Polbot